Nerang–Murwillumbah Road is a continuous  road route in the Gold Coast region of Queensland, Australia. The entire road is signed as State Route 97. Nerang–Murwillumbah Road (number 201) is a state-controlled district road, rated as a local road of regional significance (LRRS).

Route Description
It passes the exit to Beechmont Road as it turns south into Advancetown, and soon passes the exit to Advancetown–Mudgeeraba Road (Latimers Crossing Road) (State Route 42). The road again turns south-west, passing through Advancetown village before reaching the north-western extremity of Advancetown Lake, the body of water retained by the Hinze Dam.

The road continues in a southerly direction, following the western shore of the lake, until it reaches the south-western extremity. Here it crosses the Nerang River and passes the exit to Gold Coast–Springbrook Road (Pine Creek Road). It then leaves the river and follows a ridge line, climbing until it reaches the Queensland / New South Wales border, where it ends. The physical road continues into New South Wales as Numinbah Road (Tourist Drive 34).

Land use along the road is primarily rural, with much natural bushland.

Road condition
Nerang–Murwillumbah Road is fully sealed.

History

The township of Nerang was surveyed in 1865. It became important to the surrounding district because it was the head of navigation on the Nerang River and the site of the first crossing for wheeled vehicles. From 1871 a Cobb & Co coach service ran from Brisbane, and river transport became more regular. The first industry to flourish was timber cutting, later followed by dairying and crop farming as tracts of native timber were cleared. The railway arrived in 1889.

Timber cutting began in Numinbah Valley soon after cedar was discovered there in 1845, and in the Advancetown area in the 1870s, with a saw mill established in 1881. Bullock teams hauled timber to Nerang for dispatch to customers, at first by ship and later by train. The village of Advancetown began as a rest stop for the bullock teams. In the 1860s surveyors mapping the Queensland / New South Wales border discovered a route from Numinbah Valley to the Tweed Valley in New South Wales. This, combined with the clearance of timber, led to settlers moving into the area.

The road first cut for bullock teams became a necessity for settlers, and improvements were made to support the operation of new farms.

Upgrade

Improve safety
A project to improve safety on the road, at a cost of $37.5 million, was under construction in November 2021.

Major intersections
All distances are from Google Maps. The entire route is in the Gold Coast local government area.

See also

 List of road routes in Queensland
 List of numbered roads in Queensland

Notes

References

Roads in New South Wales
Roads in Queensland